
Capstone may refer to:

 Cap stone, capstone or coping, part of the top of an exterior masonry wall or building
 Capstone, another name for a keystone in architecture

Brands and enterprises
 Capstone Partners, an investment banking firm
 Capstone Publishers, a children's educational book publisher
 Capstone Records, an American classical music record label
 Capstone Software, a computer game company
 Capstone Turbine, a microturbine manufacturer

Education
 Capstone Military Leadership Program, a training course for U.S. generals and admirals
 Capstone course or capstone unit, the culminating element of an educational program
Capstone Prize or Award, a prize awarded in the capstone course
 The Capstone, a nickname for the University of Alabama campus

Other uses
 Capstone (cryptography), a US government project for cryptographic standardization
 Capstone Farm Country Park, a nature reserve and park near Gillingham, Kent, United Kingdom
CAPSTONE (spacecraft), a lunar orbiter

See also 
 Caprock, a harder or more resistant rock type overlying a weaker or less resistant rock type
 Monadnock, an isolated rock hill, knob, ridge, or small mountain